Melvyn Rosenman Leventhal (born March 18, 1943) is an American attorney known for his work as a community organizer and lawyer in the 1960s–70s Civil Rights Movement, and for being the husband of author Alice Walker for ten years; they were the first legally married interracial couple in Mississippi history.

Early life and education
Born and raised in Brooklyn, New York City, Leventhal attended a yeshiva elementary school and Brooklyn Technical High School. When he was nine years old, his parents divorced, and he and his siblings were split up, with the father taking Leventhal's older brother to live with him. Leventhal recalled that he rarely saw his father after that, and that on one occasion, when Leventhal was a teenager, he took a younger sibling to see their father, who "slammed the door in our face". In Leventhal's formative years he was greatly influenced by Judaism's emphasis on community service and in particular recalls being "outraged and disgusted by the way white people treated Jackie Robinson". He resolved to fight injustice, and in pursuit of this, after receiving his undergraduate degree from New York University's Washington Square College in 1964, he received a J.D. from the New York University School of Law in 1967.

Early career and marriage
As a young lawyer, Leventhal worked in Mississippi for the NAACP Legal Defense Fund (“LDF”), and from this work he formed the first interracial law partnership in the state's history, with Reuben V. Anderson, Fred L. Banks Jr., and John A. Nichols. Anderson and Banks went on to become the first two African American justices of the Mississippi Supreme Court.

Through his work, Leventhal met Alice Walker, who came to trust and admire him due to his willingness to endanger his own social status and well-being by standing up to bigotry. On March 17, 1967, Leventhal and Walker married in New York, in a civil ceremony performed by Family Court Judge Justine W. Polier. The marriage was at that time illegal in Walker's home state of Georgia. When the couple returned to Mississippi in July 1967, they were the first legally married interracial couple in the state. Walker and Leventhal had one child, Rebecca Walker, and divorced in 1976.

During spring, summer and winter recesses from law school, Leventhal worked as a student volunteer at LDF's offices in Jackson, Mississippi, under Marian Wright Edelman's supervision. This included serving as LDF's liaison to Martin Luther King, Jr., during the June 1966 Meredith March Against Fear from Memphis, Tennessee, to Jackson.

From 1969 to 1974 Leventhal served as LDF's lead counsel in Mississippi. He represented plaintiffs in approximately 75 lawsuits filed throughout the state to eliminate segregation and discrimination in public schools, employment, public accommodations, housing and municipal services (e.g., street paving, street lighting and fire protection). After Leventhal moved back to New York in 1974, he continued to work for LDF as a staff attorney, litigating cases brought in Mississippi and other states. His ten-year career at the LDF was highlighted by three landmark cases:
Alexander v. Holmes County Board of Education, 396 U.S. 19 (1969), in which the Supreme Court of the United States brought to an end the era of "all deliberate speed" and ordered school districts to desegregate "at once".
Norwood v. Harrison, 413 U.S. 455 (1973), in which the Supreme Court of the United States held unconstitutional state textbook assistance to private schools that discriminate on the basis of race.
Hawkins v. Town of Shaw, 437 F.2d 1286 (5th Cir. 1971), affirmed on rehearing en banc, 461 F. 2d 1171 (5th Cir. 1972), in which the United States Court of Appeals for the Fifth Circuit upheld lawsuits challenging racial discrimination in the provision of municipal services.

Leventhal also testified before the U.S. Senate's Select Committee on Equal Educational Opportunity in 1970 on the progress of school desegregation in Mississippi.

Later public service career
After returning to New York in 1974, Leventhal remarried. Between 1979 and 1984, he served first as the Assistant Attorney General of New York, in charge of the Consumer Frauds and Protection Bureau, and then as the Deputy First Assistant Attorney General of New York and Chief of the Litigation Bureau. Leventhal has argued two cases before the Supreme Court of the United States, Norwood v. Harrison, 413 U.S. 455 (1973, argued in 1972) and Blum v. Stenson, 465 U.S. 886 (1984, argued in 1983).

References

1943 births
People from Brooklyn
American civil rights lawyers
New York University School of Law alumni
Lawyers from New York City
20th-century American Jews
Living people
Brooklyn Technical High School alumni
21st-century American Jews
20th-century American lawyers
21st-century American lawyers